Alkis Dimitris (born 23 July 1980) is a Greek footballer manager and former professional player who played as a defender. He has spent the majority of his career representing Cretan clubs in various leagues of the Greek football league system, including the Greek Superleague.

Playing career
Born in Sarandë, Dimitris' family moved to Heraklion, Crete where he began playing football with Ergotelis in the Delta Ethniki. He was instrumental in helping Ergotelis earn consecutive promotions, which eventually brought the club in the Greek Superleague in 2004. During this period, Dimitris made a total of 83 appearances and scored 5 goals for the Cretan club. He then went on to play for one season with Veria in the 2005–06 Beta Ethniki, followed by a six-month move to Cypriot club AEP Paphos. Afterwards, Dimitris returned to Greece and went on to play for 2nd division clubs Kallithea, Ilioupoli and Fokikos, before returning to Crete and signing with Football League side Platanias. He spent six months with Platanias in the Football League, and an additional four years in the Greek Superleague, after the club achieved promotion to the latter during the 2011–12 Football League season. On 19 June 2016, the 35-year old defender returned to Ergotelis. He was released from his contract in January 2017, and subsequently joined another Cretan club competing in the Gamma Ethniki, AEEK INKA. He followed the club in their relegation to the Chania Football Clubs Association A Division championship, where he retired his playing career in the summer of 2018, having won the local championship.

Managerial career
After retiring, Dimitris was offered the head coach position of Chania FCA A Division club Doxa Pachiana.

References

External links
Profile at EPAE.org
Profile at Onsports.gr

Living people
1980 births
People from Sarandë
Greek footballers
Association football defenders
Cypriot First Division players
Ergotelis F.C. players
Veria F.C. players
Kallithea F.C. players
AEP Paphos FC players
Platanias F.C. players
Greek expatriate footballers
Greek expatriate sportspeople in Cyprus
Expatriate footballers in Cyprus